A Gurmata (Punjabi: ਗੁਰਮਤਾ; literally, 'Guru's intention' or 'advice of the Guru'), alternatively romanized as Gurumatta, is an order upon a subject that affects the fundamental principles of Sikh religion and is binding upon all Sikhs. 
Gurmata is similar to Fatwa in the Muslim tradition with a difference that Fatwa is not binding on all Muslims while Gurmata is binding on all Khalsa, however it is not binding on non-Khalsa Sikhs. Gurmatas were used in the 18th century to refer to the resolutions passed by the Sarbat Khalsa, a large gathering of esteemed Sikhs.

Significant Gurmatas

See also 

 Hukamnama, an injunction or edict issued by the Sikh gurus, their officiated followers, the Takhts, or taken from the Guru Granth Sahib
 Rakhi system, the protection tax implemented by the Sikh Confederacy

References

Sikh terminology
Sikh practices